Maroldsweisach is a municipality in the district of Haßberge in Bavaria in Germany.

Culture and sights 
 Alte Burg (Altenstein), the "Old Castle"
 Altenstein Castle
 Ditterswind Palace
 Hafenpreppach Palace
 Maroldsweisach Palace
 Pfaffendorf Palace
 Pfaffendorf Village Church
 Birkenfeld Palace
 Jewish Cemetery with memorial tablets to persecuted and murdered Jews

Local Citizens of Note
 Joseph Brunner (November 26, 1706 –– November 19, 1827) was born in Trappstadt and died in Altenstein. Once considered to have been the oldest proven person, information has recently surfaced which suggests he may have only been born in 1739, making him 88 years old at the time of his death 
 Rudolf Berthold, the World War I flying ace and Pour le Merite winner, was born in Ditterswind.

Endnotes

References
 Franks, Norman; Bailey, Frank W.; Guest, Russell. Above the Lines: The Aces and Fighter Units of the German Air Service, Naval Air Service and Flanders Marine Corps, 1914–1918. Grub Street, 1993. , .

Haßberge (district)